Phyllomacromia kimminsi is a species of dragonfly in the family Corduliidae. It is found in Botswana, Ivory Coast, Kenya, Sierra Leone, Uganda, and Zambia. Its natural habitats are subtropical or tropical moist lowland forests and rivers.

References

Corduliidae
Taxonomy articles created by Polbot